Bread and Authority in Russia, 1914—1921, is a history book by Lars T. Lih about the food crisis in the Russian Empire and Soviet Union (war communism).

Description 
In his controversial work, which was originally a PhD thesis of Lars Lih, he claims that the seven-year period he examined was the key to understanding the causes and course of the Russian Revolution. The book, containing eighteen tables, seventeen of which are in the final chapter, is intended for specialists and includes a bibliographic list useful for researchers of the Russian food crisis of the times of World War I and war communism.

References

Bibliography 
 Books
 
 
 
 

 Articles
 
 
 
 
 
 
 
 
 
 
 
 
 
 
 
 
 
 

1990 non-fiction books
American history books
English-language books
History books about Russia
University of California Press books